Michigan Underwater Preserves or Michigan Bottomland Preserves are protected areas of the Great Lakes on Michigan's coast. The program is currently receiving no funding from the state and does not offer any extra legal protection for the sites in the preserves. However, it is a felony to remove or disturb underwater artifacts in the Great Lakes. Persons apprehended and convicted of removing or willfully damaging underwater artifacts risk confiscation of their equipment (boats, cars, dive gear, etc.), stiff fines and up to two years imprisonment. The Michigan Underwater Preserve Council advocates on behalf of all of Michigan's Underwater Preserves.

Below is a list of the 13 underwater preserves in the State of Michigan:

Alger Underwater Preserve
De Tour Passage Underwater Preserve
Grand Traverse Bay Bottomland Preserve
Keweenaw Underwater Preserve
Manitou Passage Underwater Preserve
Marquette Underwater Preserve
Sanilac Shores Underwater Preserve
Southwest Michigan Underwater Preserve
Straits of Mackinac Shipwreck Preserve
Thumb Area Bottomland Preserve
Thunder Bay National Marine Sanctuary and Underwater Preserve
West Michigan Underwater Preserve
Whitefish Point Underwater Preserve

References

External links
Grand Traverse Bay Underwater Preserve Website
Michigan Department of Environmental Quality
Michigan Underwater Preserves Council Website
Southwest Michigan Underwater Preserve Website
 Straits of Mackinac Shipwreck Preserve Website
 Thunder Bay National Marine Sanctuary Website
 West Michigan Underwater Preserve Website

Marine parks of Michigan